Rosa Iveth Montezuma Montero (born 16 May 1993) is a Panamanian  model and beauty pageant titleholder who was crowned Señorita Panamá 2018 and represented Panama at the Miss Universe 2018.

Personal life
Montezuma was born in David, Chiriquí and raised in Alto Caballero. She is pursuing a bachelor's degree in Educational informatics and also has a degree in Food Science and Technology.

Pageantry

Señorita Panamá 2018
Montezuma was crowned Señorita Panamá 2018 on June 7, 2018 at Roberto Duran Arena in Panama City and then competed at the Miss Universe 2018. She represented the Comarcas.

Miss Universe 2018
Montezuma represented Panama at Miss Universe 2018 pageant in Bangkok, Thailand on December 17,2018, but she did not place among the Top 20.

See also
 Señorita Panamá 2018
 Solaris Barba
 Shirel Ortiz
 Diana Lemos

References

External links

1993 births
Living people
People from David District
Panamanian beauty pageant winners
Panamanian female models
Miss Universe 2018 contestants